Milan Đuričić (31 October 1961 – 1 August 2022) was a Serbian football manager.

Career
Đuričić served as manager of numerous Serbian SuperLiga and Serbian First League clubs, most notably Vojvodina (two spells). He also served as an assistant to Savo Milošević at Partizan from 2019 to 2020.

References

External links
 
 

1961 births
2022 deaths
People from Stara Pazova
Serbia and Montenegro football managers
Serbian football managers
Serbian SuperLiga managers
FK Mačva Šabac managers
FK Vojvodina managers
FK Zemun managers
FK Inđija managers
FK Metalac Gornji Milanovac managers
FK Radnički Niš managers
FK Zvijezda 09 managers
FK Partizan non-playing staff
FK Napredak Kruševac managers
Premier League of Bosnia and Herzegovina managers
Serbian expatriate football managers
Expatriate football managers in Bosnia and Herzegovina
Serbian expatriate sportspeople in Bosnia and Herzegovina